Sinquerim is a village in Bardez sub-district, North Goa, India.

Local attractions
Sinquerim is famous for its beautiful beach.

Location
It is 16 km from Panaji. Nearest railway station is at Carambolim. Nearest airport is Dabolim Airport.

References

External links
 About Sinquerim
 About Sinquerim beach

Villages in North Goa district
Beaches of Goa
Beaches of North Goa district